This is a list of flags used in the Czech Republic to further history.

Current flags

State flag

Governmental flags

Military flags

Banners of the Armed Forces
Each branch of the Armed Forces of the Czech Republic has a representative banner, each branch of the Army of the Czech Republic like Czech Land Forces, the Czech Air Force, and Special Forces has representative banner which together represents the entire Armed Forces as a whole.

Police flags

Banners of special forces

Parliamentary flags

Subnational flags

Historic regions

Regional flags

Municipal flags

Historical flags

National flags

Military flags

War flags

Hussite Wars

University flags

Organizations

Firefighting Associations flags

Vexillology Associations flags

Sport Associations flags

Political flags

Religious flags

Roman Catholic flags

Other Christian flags

Ethnic groups flags

Proposed flags

House Flags

See also
 List of Slovak flags
 Flag of the Czech Republic
 Coat of arms of the Czech Republic
 National symbols of the Czech Republic

References

External links

Czech Republic at crwflags.com

Flags
Czech Republic